Arimpara ("The Wart"; alternate title A Story That Begins at the End) is a 2003 Indian drama film directed by Murali Nair. It was screened in the Un Certain Regard section at the 2003 Cannes Film Festival. It won the John Abraham Award for Best Malayalam Film in 2003.

Plot
Based on O.V. Vijayan's story of the same name, this is the story of Krishnan Unni and his wart. Krishnan Unni is a landlord living happily with his wife and son. He comes from a family that is well respected in the village. But things have changed now; labourers are no more the bonded slaves who used to bend over for their landlords. Krishnan Unni still lives in the past glory days and refuses to change with time. The story takes a "Kafkaish" turn when a wart in his face takes a life of its own. What happens to Krishnan Unni forms the rest of the story.

The wart is a metaphor for the burden of old customs and traditions. Krishnan Unni, who is well rooted in the old traditional ways, refuses to change with the times. He refuses to get surgery on the wart, but tries to cure it with old way of herbal medicine. The lesson here is if one doesn't change with time, the old customs and blind faith will become a burden and, if one persists in them, there will be a time when they will take over, meaning all of a person's decisions will be based on how they traditionally did it or what the old scriptures or astrological charts dictate. After a while these old traditions and customs, will be taken out as something personal to an individual or a group and would be associated with god, it would be made into something holy. Now everybody has to do it as it is divine. Murali in the end shows how the wart which was growing in him escapes from Krishnan Unni and becomes a huge elephant. There are a bunch of priests who are looking at the elephant and they comment, such a big animal, we should keep it in the temple. The wart which was personal to one person has become divine and holy to everyone now. All he had to do to cure the wart was to seek the help of science.

Cast
 Nedumudi Venu as Krishnan Unni
 Sona Nair
 Bharathan Njavakkal
 Rajan Sithara
 Master Bhagyanath
 Nakuul Mehta

References

External links

2003 films
2003 drama films
Indian drama films
Films directed by Murali Nair
2000s Malayalam-language films